White Horse Hotel may refer to:

 White Horse Hotel, Romsey, Hampshire, England
 White Horse Hotel, Surry Hills, New South Wales, Australia
 White Horse Hotel, Toowoomba, Queensland, Australia
 White Horse Hotel, which gave its name to Whitehorse Road, which became Maroondah Highway, in Melbourne, Australia

See also
 White horse (disambiguation)
 White Horse Tavern (disambiguation)
 The White Horse Inn (disambiguation)